Homalium longifolium (locally known as petaling gajah) is a species of plant in the family Salicaceae. It is found in Malaysia and Thailand.

References

longifolium
Least concern plants
Taxonomy articles created by Polbot